Makkuva is a village in Parvathipuram Manyam district of the Indian state of Andhra Pradesh.

Geography
It has an average elevation of 123 meters (406 feet).

Demography
Makkuva mandal has a population of about 60,000 in 2007. Males consists of 33,000 and females 27,000 of the population. The average literacy rate is 48%, below the national average of 59.5%. Male literacy rate is 61% and that of females 35%.

See also
 Makkuva mandal
 Parvathipuram Manyam district

References

Villages in Parvathipuram Manyam district